Uchee, also known as Spains Stand,  is an unincorporated community in Russell County, Alabama, United States.

History
Uchee is named after the nearby Uchee Creek, which in turn is named for the Yuchi tribe. The word "yuchi" probably means "at a distance" in the Yuchi language, with yu meaning "at a distance" and chi meaning "sitting down". The Yuchi lived in the area around present day Russell County, Alabama and Fort Benning, Georgia, before being removed to the Indian Territory. The Uchee Methodist Church is listed on the National Register of Historic Places. A post office was operated in Uchee from 1835 to 1907.

Demographics

Uchee appeared on the 1880 U.S. Census as an unincorporated community of 63 residents. This was the only time it appeared on the census rolls.

Notable people
 Johnny Allen, R&B arranger and pianist
 William Henry Denson, U.S. Representative from 1893 to 1895

References

Unincorporated communities in Russell County, Alabama
Unincorporated communities in Alabama
Alabama placenames of Native American origin